The Coat of arms of the Municipality of the Hydromineral Spa of Águas de São Pedro is the official coat of arms of Águas de São Pedro.

History
The coat of arms of Águas de São Pedro was designed by the heraldist Professor Arcinoé Antonio Peixoto de Faria, from the Municipalist Heraldic Encyclopedia. It was created by the request of the municipal government, that needed a symbol to represent the city.

Use
The coat of arms of Águas de São Pedro started to be used in the Municipal Office in the beginning of 1971, but was only officialized by law on July 7, 1972. Before 1971 it was the coat of arms of the state of São Paulo that was used in the municipal official documents.

Despite all the rules imposed by the law for the display of the coat of arms, it is very common to see it being exhibited with several errors, like on the city's website, such as the use of the bleu celeste instead of azure on the shield, and display of the Or tincture in the fonts and letters of the motto in the scroll, instead of the correct argent tincture.

It is currently used in the header of official documents, official buildings, on municipal ID cards, in the flag of the municipality, and in the Municipal Order of the Coat.

Blazon
According to the text of the Municipal Law number 408 of July 7, 1972, Article I, the heraldic blazon of Águas de São Pedro's coat of arms is:

Symbolism
The symbols of the coat of arms are described in the Single Paragraph of Article I of the Law number 408 of July 7, 1972, as follows:

Shield
The samnite shield used to represent the Coat of arms of the Spa of Águas de São Pedro was the first style of shield introduced in Portugal by French influence, inherited by the Brazilian heraldry as an evocative of the colonizing race and main molder of the Brazilian nationality.

In abyss (the center or heart of the shield) the panoply constituted by intersected keys beneath a papal tiara, all in Or (gold), constitutes its canting arms, for being symbol of Saint Peter, Patron Saint of the city (the keys of the Kingdom of God and the Tiara of the first Pope, Saint Peter).

Mural crown
The mural crown that crowns the shield is the universal symbol of the coats of arms of dominion, and being of argent (silver) with six towers, which only four are visible in perspective in the drawing, classify the city represented as the seat of a municipality.

Tinctures
The tincture azure (blue) in the field of the shield is symbol of nobility, justice, perseverance, zeal and loyalty; the metal Or (gold) is symbol of glory, splendor, grandness, wealth, sovereignty; the metal argent (silver) is symbol of peace, friendship, labour, prosperity, purity, religiosity.

Three fountains
The three heraldic fountains argent (silver) reminds in the escutcheon the three mineral water fountains existent in the city, one of them with sulphurous waters, gift of nature that constitutes the main municipal wealth, reason of its autonomy to the progressist evolution, origin of the toponym that the city boasts ("Águas" means "Waters" in Portuguese).

Supporters
As supporters, two cornucopias sprinkling coins, all in Or (gold) symbolizing abundance, richness, and the wealth that comes from the soil with its fountains with miraculous waters.

Motto
In a scroll azure (blue) in letters argent (silver) it is inscribed the Latin motto "Omnibus Pax et Sanitas" that is an invitation to tourism and recreation, meaning For everyone, peace and health.

References

External links

  Prefeitura de Águas de São Pedro The official website of Águas de São Pedro.
  Câmara da Estância de Águas de São Pedro Águas de São Pedro Municipal Council website.

Aguas de Sao Pedro
Aguas de Sao Pedro
Aguas de Sao Pedro
Aguas de Sao Pedro